The Nandi Award for Best Actor was commissioned by the Nandi Awards committee in 1977. The winner is awarded a "Silver Nandi", "Sri Rajendra Prasad Gold Medal", cash award and a commendation certificate. Venkatesh has won the most Best Actor awards with five wins, followed by Mahesh Babu with four wins.

Winners

References

See also
 Cinema of Andhra Pradesh
 Nandi Awards

Actor